Sistar (stylized as SISTAR) was a South Korean girl group formed in 2010 by Starship Entertainment. The group consisted of Hyolyn, Bora, Soyou and Dasom. They made their official debut with the song "Push Push" on 3 June 2010. Their debut studio album So Cool was released on 9 August 2011. Their second album, Give It to Me, was released on 11 June 2013. Their biggest hits include "So Cool", "Alone", "Touch My Body", "Loving U" and "Give It to Me". Their fourth single, "So Cool," debuted at number one on the Gaon Digital Chart as well as the Billboard Korea K-Pop Hot 100 singles chart, starting a streak of 9 consecutive number-one hits before the group's disbandment in 2017.

Sistar has amassed prominent digital sales, being one of five Korean artists to have nine or more number one singles on Gaon.

History

2010–2012: Debut, finding success with So Cool, Alone and Loving U

Sistar began their group activities early in 2010 with commercials and magazine photoshoots. They made their official debut with the song "Push Push" on 3 June 2010, followed by their debut television performance on 4 June on Music Bank.

The group returned on 25 August with their second single, "Shady Girl", the music video featured Kim Hee-chul of Super Junior. The group received a lot of media attention when a fan-taken video was uploaded online showing the group filming their performance at "Let's Start Sharing Concert" on 28 August. During the middle of their performance, member Bora suddenly fell onstage, fracturing her thumb. This prompted the other members to stop singing and assist her off the stage with the help of staff. Several minutes later, Bora returned to stage along with the other members to finish filming their performance. The video went viral on the internet and was featured on G4's online show Attack of the Show!, and an RTL Television news segment.

On 14 September, Sistar was invited to perform at Japan's "Hallyu Music Festival" as the only Korean girl group present. On 10 October, Sistar performed on the show Teen Superstar in Thailand. The group released their third single, "How Dare You," in November. On 9 December, the group attended the Golden Disc Awards and won the "Newcomer Award." On 27 December, Sistar won their first music show award for "How Dare You" on Music Bank.

On 27 April, it was announced that Sistar would debut a sub-unit, Sistar19, with members Hyolyn and Bora. Their debut song, "Ma Boy", was released on 3 May. Sistar19 had their debut performance on 5 May and promoted throughout the month. Sistar returned on 9 August with their first studio album entitled So Cool. "So Cool" was the inaugural number one song on the Billboard Korea K-Pop Hot 100 chart after the chart's launch on 25 August. On 11 September, Sistar won their first "Mutizen Award" on Inkigayo.

In early April, it was announced that Sistar was going to broadcast their "So Cool" comeback showcase globally in 41 countries. Their first mini album, entitled Alone, was released on 12 April and contained six songs produced by Brave Brothers. Their second mini album, Loving U, was released on 28 June. The EP contained the title track, "Loving U", produced by Duble Sidekick, one new song "Holiday" and remixes of the groups' past hits.

2013–2015: Give It to Me, summer hits and solo/duo activities

Sistar19 released their first mini album, Gone Not Around Any Longer, and its title track of the same name on 31 January 2013. Their recording label, Starship Entertainment, announced on 16 May 2013, that Sistar will return mid-June, with another confirmation on 2 June, stating that they will be making their comeback with a second full album. On 3 June 2013, teaser photos featuring members Dasom and Bora were released. The following day, Sistar released photo teasers of all the members for Give It to Me and revealed that they will have a Moulin Rouge theme. A video teaser for "Give It to Me" was released on 6 June. Sistar's second studio album, Give It to Me, was released on 11 June with the title track of the same name. The album debuted at number four on Gaon Music Chart. On 26 October, Sistar represented South Korea at ABU TV Song Festival 2013 in Hanoi, Vietnam, performing "Give It to Me". Three more singles off the album: "The Way You Make Me Melt", "Crying" and "Bad Boy", as well as two promotional singles, were also released to promote the album. On 26 November, Hyolyn released her debut studio album Love & Hate, which reached number five on Gaon.

On 5 June 2014, Sistar's label, Starship Entertainment, told Newsen that the group was working on a new album and would come back in the beginning of July. On 21 July, Sistar released their third mini album, Touch N Move along with its title track "Touch My Body". EP was commercially very successful, peaking at numbers two and eight on Gaon and Billboard's US World Albums charts, respectively. Another single "Naughty Hands" was released in late July. On 26 August, Sistar released their fourth mini album and second summer special album titled Sweet & Sour, shortly after the promotions of "Touch My Body". EP contained two new songs "I Swear" and "Hold on Tight" and four remixes for singles "Loving U", "Gone Not Around Any Longer", "Give It to Me" and "Touch My Body". In December, Sistar won the Best Female Group Award at the 2014 Mnet Asian Music Awards.

On 22 June 2015, Sistar released its fifth mini-album, Shake It, along with its title track of the same name. It debuted at number three on Gaon, and two new singles, "Shake It" and "Don't Be Such a Baby" were released in late June. In August, Hyolyn was confirmed to join the second season of Unpretty Rapstar. On 1 August, Sistar performed in Los Angeles, California at 2015 KCON. On 14 August, they performed at The 70th Independence Day of the Republic of Korea, their home country. On 7 September, Hyolyn released a free single, "The Wall Destroyer" featuring one of Eluphant's member, Keebee. On 22 September, Soyou collaborated with singer Kwon Jeong Yeol of 10cm. Their single is titled "Lean on Me."

2016–2017: Insane Love, "Lonely" and disbandment
On 21 June 2016, Sistar released their fourth extended play, Insane Love, and its lead single "I Like That". The single debuted at number 1 on the Gaon Digital Chart, continuing the group's string of summertime hit songs. "I Like That" also topped several K-pop music video charts in China, including QQ Music, iQIYI, and YinYueTai. For the song, Sistar was awarded Singer of the Year for June in the Digital Music Category at the 2016 Gaon Chart Music Awards.

On 22 May 2017, Starship Entertainment announced that Sistar would disband following promotions for their final single, "Lonely", to be released on 31 May. All the members wrote personal letters of farewell to their fans, confirming their disbandment. The group performed their most successful summer hits—"Touch My Body", "Shake It", "Loving U", and "I Swear"—along with "Lonely" on four major music shows before their final performance on Inkigayo on 4 June. "Lonely" debuted at number one on the Gaon Digital Chart released on 8 June.

2022: Reunion performance
On 22 July 2022, the members of Sistar reunited to perform several of their hit songs on the final episode of You Hee-yeol's Sketchbook as a way to show support for Hyolyn's then-recent comeback.

Subgroups

Sistar's subgroup, Sistar19, debuted in 2011, featuring Hyolyn and Bora. The group's first single, "Ma Boy", was released in May 2011 followed by a second single, "Gone Not Around Any Longer", in January 2013, alongside the EP with the same name, released on 31 January.

Discography

 So Cool (2011)
 Give It to Me (2013)

Tours

Concerts
 2012: Femme Fatale
 2013: Live Concert: S
 2014: Live Concert: S - Hong Kong

Filmography

Television

Awards and nominations

See also
 List of best-selling girl groups

References

External links

 
 

 
2010 establishments in South Korea
K-pop music groups
Musical groups disestablished in 2017
2017 disestablishments in South Korea
Musical groups established in 2010
Musical groups from Seoul
South Korean dance music groups
South Korean electronic musicians
South Korean girl groups
South Korean contemporary R&B musical groups
Starship Entertainment artists
MAMA Award winners
Melon Music Award winners